Jérôme Leroy is the name of:

 Jérôme Leroy (footballer) (born 1974), French footballer
 Jérôme Leroy (composer) (born 1981), French film composer, orchestrator and conductor